CRi is the stage name of Christophe Dubé, a Canadian electronic musician from Quebec.

Originally from Quebec City, he was a beatboxer for local hip hop group Feuilles et Racines before releasing his debut EP as an electronic artist in 2013. He released a number of standalone tracks and remixes for other artists before following up with the EPs Tell Her in 2016, Someone Else in 2017, and Initial in 2019.

In 2019, CRi and Charlotte Cardin collaborated on a cover of Daniel Bélanger's "Fous n'importe où". Juvenile, his first full-length album, was released in 2020, and included Bélanger as a guest vocalist on the track "Signal".

Someone Else was a Juno Award nominee for Electronic Album of the Year at the Juno Awards of 2018, and Juvenile was a Juno nominee in the same category at the Juno Awards of 2021.

He is the brother of actress and filmmaker Alexa-Jeanne Dubé.

References

21st-century Canadian male musicians
Canadian electronic musicians
Musicians from Quebec City
French Quebecers
Living people
Year of birth missing (living people)
Félix Award winners
Canadian beatboxers